Jerome Kennedy Fitzgerald (born 3 April 1966) is a Bahamian politician and former Cabinet Minister.

Education 

Fitzgerald was educated at St Andrew's School, University of London (LLM, 1989) and the Cass Business School (MSc, 1992).

Political career 

Fitzgerald served as a Senator from 2007 to 2012.

During his time as Senator, he denounced the dredging in the Exuma Cays Land and Sea Park at the time for Bell Island.

He was elected Member of Parliament for the Marathon constituency in 2012 and served as Minister of Education, Science & Technology from 2012 until 2017.

In 2021, he became a special advisor in the Office of the Prime Minister.

References

1966 births
Living people
Alumni of King's College London
Alumni of City, University of London
Alumni of Bayes Business School
Members of the Senate of the Bahamas
Progressive Liberal Party politicians
Government ministers of the Bahamas
People from Nassau, Bahamas